The minister for women and equalities is a ministerial position in the United Kingdom which leads the Government Equalities Office. This is an independent department within the wider Cabinet Office that has responsibility for addressing all forms of discrimination, with particular emphasis on gender inequality. Prior to April 2019, the minister was based at the Home Office, DFID and DfE. Its counterpart in the shadow cabinet is the shadow secretary of state for women and equalities.

The minister is deputised by two parliamentary under-secretaries of state; the parliamentary under-secretary of state for women and the parliamentary under-secretary of state for equalities.

The position was formerly known as; "Minister for Women", "Minister for Women and Equality", and "Minister for Equalities".

History
The position of Minister for Women was created by Tony Blair when he became prime minister as a means of prioritising women's issues across government. Prior to that, there had been an equality unit in the Cabinet Office and a Cabinet committee, which were continued under the leadership of the new minister. When Gordon Brown succeeded Blair, he created the post of Minister for Women and Equality to handle a wider range of equalities issues. The first Minister for Women and, ten years later, the first Minister for Women and Equality was Harriet Harman. On 12 October 2007 a new department, the Government Equalities Office, was created to support the minister. When David Cameron became prime minister, he renamed the position to "Minister for Women and Equalities" without a change in its responsibilities. Since its creation, the position has always been held by a minister sitting in Cabinet by virtue of another office (i.e., a Secretary of State or Leader of one of the Houses of Parliament).

Justine Greening replaced Nicky Morgan as both Secretary of State for Education and Minister for Women and Equalities when Theresa May was appointed Prime Minister on 13 July 2016. Morgan initially held the title of Minister for Women after the resignation of Maria Miller in April 2014, in conjunction with being Financial Secretary to the Treasury, whilst the Equalities brief was given to Sajid Javid who had replaced Miller as Secretary of State for Culture. While the Women and Equalities briefs were recombined in July 2014, the responsibility for marriage equality was assigned to Nick Boles, who held the title of Minister of State for Skills, Enterprise and Equalities and had a base in both the Education and Business departments. Both splits in responsibilities were due to Nicky Morgan having voted against the legalisation of gay marriage.

Lord Northbourne called for the creation of a minister to concentrate on issues specific to men. Instead Prime Minister Liz Truss decided to make the Minister for Equalities value both men and woman equally stating that it was “dehumanising” to be “treated as a woman”, calling for everyone to be seen as “individual humans” instead.

The two most recent female Prime Ministers, Theresa May and Liz Truss, served in this position.

List of ministers

See also
 Government Equalities Office
 Women and Equalities Committee
 Minister for Gender Equality (Sweden)

External links 

 Ministers in the Labour Governments: 1997–2010

References

Women and Equality
Women and Equality
Gender equality ministries
Women in the United Kingdom
2007 establishments in the United Kingdom
1997 establishments in the United Kingdom
Government Equalities Office